World Series of Fighting 5: Arlovski vs. Kyle was a mixed martial arts event held  in Atlantic City, New Jersey, United States.

Background

On May 15, 2013, WSOF announced a 4 man tournament to crown an Inaugural Middleweight Champion that will take place at WSOF 5. The participants announced were: Jesse Taylor, Elvis Mutapčić, David Branch & Danillo Villefort

Anthony Johnson was expected to face Mike Kyle in the main event however Johnson was forced to withdraw from the bout due to injury and was replaced by Andrei Arlovski.

The planned Middleweight Championship Tournament Semifinal bout between Elvis Mutapčić and Jesse Taylor was cancelled the night of the event when a member of the New Jersey Athletic Commission claimed they saw Mutapčić take an unknown and undisclosed medicine before the contest in the locker room.

Results

Tournament bracket

See also 
 World Series of Fighting
 List of WSOF champions
 List of WSOF events

References

Events in Atlantic City, New Jersey
World Series of Fighting events
2013 in mixed martial arts